Laetitia (English) also Laétitia (French) and Lætitia (Latin), is a girl's name that is quite popular in the south of France and is also used in Québec. It is originally a Latin name Lætitia. The Latin grapheme "æ" is increasingly replaced in France with "aé" but the name is pronounced the same.  

As Saint (Latin: Lætitia), she was à Roman Catholic saint and virgin martyr.

See more 

Laetitia Beck (born 1992), Israeli golfer
Laetitia Casta (born 1978), supermodel
Laetitia Chapeh, Equatoguinean football player
Laetitia Darche (born 1991), Belgian-Mauritian beauty pageant contestant and former Miss Mauritius
Laetitia d'Arenberg (born 1941), Uruguayan businesswoman
Laetitia Denis (born 1988), heptathlete
Laetitia Gachet (born 1975), ski mountaineer
Laetitia Griffith (born 1965), Dutch Member of Parliament for the liberal People's Party for Freedom and Democracy
Laëtitia Hubert (born 1974), figure skater
Laetitia Kamba (born 1987), basketball player
Laëtitia Le Corguillé (born 1986), BMX racer
Laetitia Corbin Lee (1657–1706), American colonist
Laetitia Lee (1731–1776), Colonial American socialite
Laëtitia Madjene (born 1986), kickboxer
Laetitia Maria of Belgium (born 2003), Belgian princess, daughter of Princess Astrid and Prince Lorenz
Laetitia Masson (born 1966), film director and screenwriter
Laetitia Meignan (born 1960), judoka
Laëtitia Philippe (born 1991), football player
Laëtitia Roux (born 1985), ski mountaineer
Lætitia Sadier (born 1968), musician, member of the bands Stereolab and Monade
Laetitia Sonami (born 1957), composer
Laëtitia Tonazzi (born 1981), football player
Laetitia Rispel (born 19??), South African Professor of Public Health

Fictional characters 
Laetitia Grinder, a character in Arthur Sullivan's 1875 short opera The Zoo
Miss Lætitia Prism, a character in Oscar Wilde's play The Importance of Being Earnest
Laetitia, a character in the anime series Madlax
Miss Laetitia Blacklock, a character in Agatha Christie's novel A Murder is Announced

See also
Letitia
Lettice
Leticia (disambiguation)

French feminine given names